Dealers is a British reality television series produced by Fever Media for the Discovery Channel. The show, hosted by Adam Shaw, premiered on 16 April 2012. The premise of the series is for members of the public to attempt to sell their family heirlooms, fine art, jewellery, collectibles and antiques to a group of five professional dealers.

The dealers include antiques dealer Scott Diament ; Jenny Pat, a Canadian television personality and former Chinese painting specialist at Christie's International Auction House in Hong Kong; Richard Gauntlett, a Pimlico Road gallery owner with expertise in 20th-century art and antique cars; Nik Robinson, a pawnbroker specialising in diamonds, jewels, fine art, and antiques; and Gillian Anderson Price, the owner of Judith Michael & Daughter Vintage Treasures, a London vintage boutique.

The show hasn't yet been renewed for a second series.

Episode list

References 

Antiques television series
Discovery Channel original programming